Ok, sometimes spelled Oak or Ock, is an uncommon Korean family name, a single-syllable Korean given name, and an element in some two-syllable Korean given names. It is usually written with a hanja meaning "jade".

Family name
The 2000 South Korean census found 22,964 people and 7,288 households with the family name Ok. The surviving bon-gwan (origin of a clan lineage, not necessarily the actual residence of the clan members) at that time included:

Uiryeong County, South Gyeongsang Province: 19,368 people and 6,157 households
Geoje, South Gyeongsang Province: 1,085 people and 345 households
Kaesong, North Hwanghae Province: 708 people and 232 households
Miryang, South Gyeongsang Province: 537 people and 174 households
Jinju, South Gyeongsang Province: 441 people and 145 households
Uiseong County, North Gyeongsang Province: 467 people and 138 households
Sacheon, South Gyeongsang Province: 197 people and 61 households
Other or unknown: 161 people and 36 households

In a study by the National Institute of the Korean Language based on 2007 application data for South Korean passports, it was found that 84.8% of people with this family name spelled it in Latin letters as Ok in their passports, while another 9.0% spelled it as Ock. Rarer alternative spellings (the remaining 6.2%) included Oak and Ohk.

People with this family name include:
Ok Kwan-bin (died 1933), Korean independence activist
Simon Ok Hyun-jin (born 1968), South Korean Roman Catholic priest, Auxiliary Bishop of the Archdiocese of Gwangju
Ock Joo-hyun (born 1980), South Korean singer, former member of Fin.K.L
Ok Taec-yeon (born 1988), South Korean singer, member of boyband 2PM
Justine Ok, 21st-century American artist and songwriter of Korean descent

Given name

Hanja and meaning
There are five hanja with the reading "ok" on the South Korean government's official list of hanja which may be registered for use in given names; they are:

: "jade"
: "house"
 (: "prison"
: "irrigate"
: "treasure"

People
People with the single-syllable given name Ok include:
Yeo Ok, poet of the Gojoseon Kingdom which fell in 108 BC
Jeon Ok (1911–1969), South Korean actress
Kim Ok (born 1964), North Korean government employee, personal secretary to Kim Jong-il

As name element
One name containing this element, Kyung-ok, was the 10th-most popular name for newborn girls in South Korea in 1950. 

Names containing this element include:
Jong-ok (unisex)
Kyung-ok (feminine)
Myung-ok (feminine)
Seon-ok (feminine)
Sun-ok (feminine)
Yeong-ok (unisex)

See also
List of Korean family names
List of Korean given names

References

Korean given names
Korean-language surnames